Jeffrey Epstein: Filthy Rich is an American web documentary television miniseries about convicted sex offender Jeffrey Epstein. The miniseries is based on the 2016 book of the same name by James Patterson, and co-written by John Connolly and Tim Malloy. Filthy Rich was released on May 27, 2020, on Netflix. The four-part documentary features interviews with several survivors including Virginia Giuffre and Maria Farmer, along with former staff members and former police chief Michael Reiter, a key individual from the first criminal case against Epstein.

Premise 
Filthy Rich tells the stories of the survivors of Jeffrey Epstein, and how he used his wealth and power to commit these crimes.

Episodes

Production 
The miniseries was based on the 2016 book Filthy Rich: A Powerful Billionaire, the Sex Scandal that Undid Him, and All the Justice that Money Can Buy: The Shocking True Story of Jeffrey Epstein written by James Patterson, and co-written by John Connolly with Tim Malloy. Filthy Rich was announced prior to Epstein's death, and was in production nine months prior to his arrest. The project was initially known as The Florida Project, taking precautions as Epstein was still alive, working on a secret server. They also worked in a locked room with cameras and a safe to hold materials.

Release 
The trailer for the miniseries was released on May 13, 2020.

Reception 
On Rotten Tomatoes, the series holds an approval rating of 82%, based on reviews from 44 critics, with an average rating of 7.00/10. The website's critics consensus reads: "It lacks new insight, but by focusing on the stories of survivors Filthy Rich sheds light on the lasting impact of Epstein's crimes." On Metacritic, the series has a weighted average score of 61 out of 100, based on 13 critics, indicating "generally favorable reviews".

See also 
 Surviving Jeffrey Epstein

References

External links 
 

2020 American television series debuts
2020 American television series endings
2020s American documentary television series
2020s American television miniseries
English-language Netflix original programming
Netflix original documentary television series
Jeffrey Epstein
Films about child sexual abuse